Peter Vaško (born 19 May 1987) is a professional Slovak footballer who currently plays for Fortuna Liga club MFK Skalica as a midfielder.

Club career

MFK Skalica

References

External links
 MFK Skalica profile
 
 Futbalnet profile
 Eurofotbal profile

1987 births
Living people
Slovak footballers
Association football midfielders
FK Varnsdorf players
MFK Skalica players